The Old Trails Bridge is a historic bridge over the Colorado River in San Bernardino County and Mohave County in the United States, that is listed on the National Register of Historic Places (NRHP). It has also been known as Topock Bridge and as Needles Bridge.

Description and history

The bridge carried a now-abandoned section of the former U.S. Route 66 across from southeast of Needles, California to south of Toprock, Arizona.  It is a brace-ribbed through arch bridge that was built in 1915–1916. It served as a highway bridge until 1947 when the Red Rock Bridge, formerly a railroad bridge, was modified for highway use. The Old Trails Bridge was later converted to a pipeline bridge.

It was listed on the NRHP on September 30, 1988.

The bridge has been seen in a number of blockbuster films including The Grapes of Wrath and Easy Rider.

See also

 National Register of Historic Places listings in Mohave County, Arizona
 National Register of Historic Places listings in San Bernardino County, California

References

External links

 Photo at Flickr, in higher resolution

Bridges over the Colorado River
Steel bridges in the United States
Through arch bridges in the United States
Bridges completed in 1916
Bridges on U.S. Route 66
Road bridges on the National Register of Historic Places in Arizona
Road bridges on the National Register of Historic Places in California
Buildings and structures in Mohave County, Arizona
Transportation in Mohave County, Arizona
Transportation buildings and structures in San Bernardino County, California
National Register of Historic Places in Mohave County, Arizona
National Register of Historic Places in San Bernardino County, California